= Monument to the heroes of the October Revolution and the Civil War =

Monument in Ufa, Russia

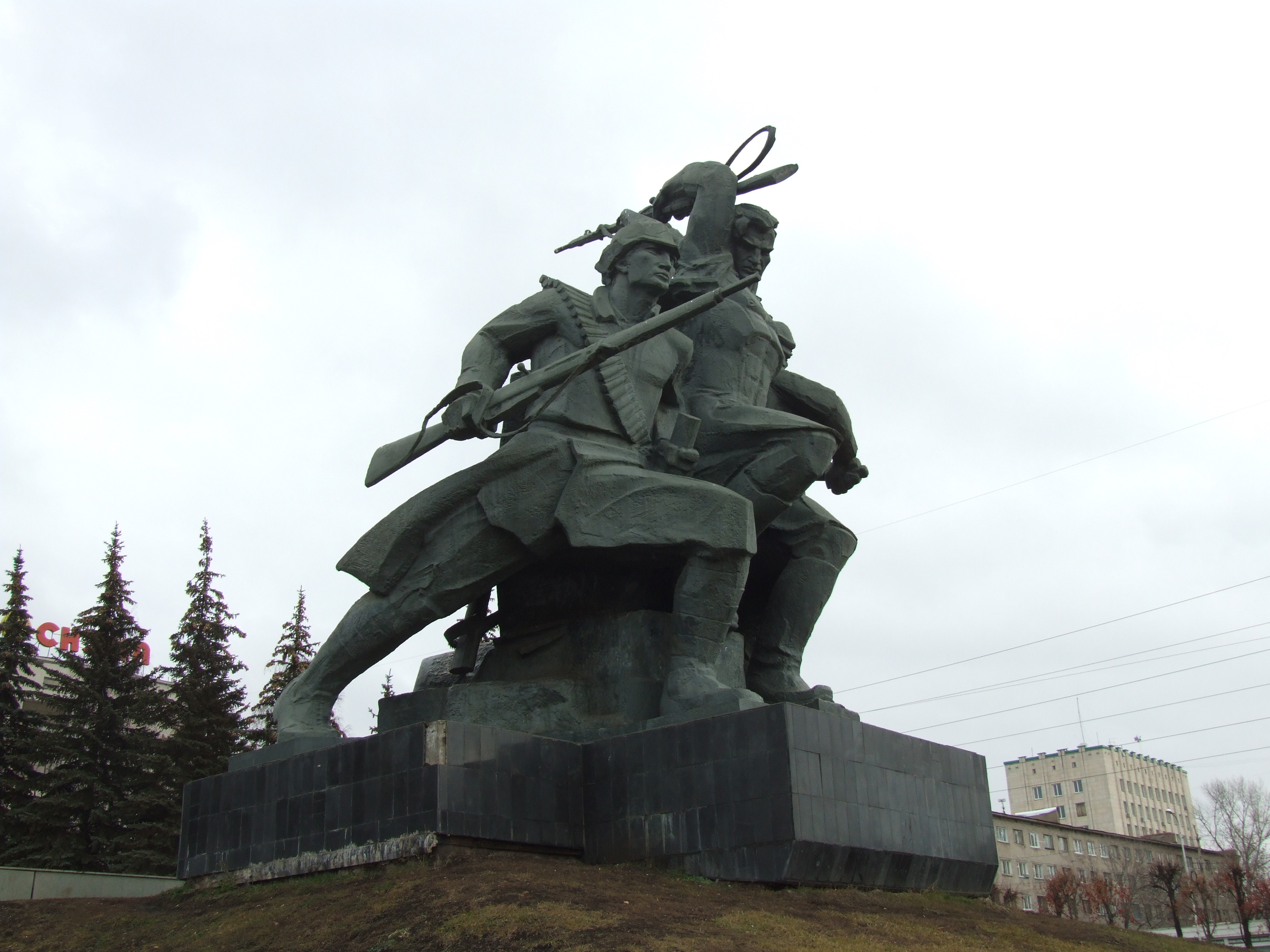
- Interactive map of Monument to the heroes of the October Revolution and the Civil War
- Location: Bashkortostan, Ufa
- Opening date: 1975
- Dedicated to: the heroes of the October Revolution and the Civil War

The Monument to the heroes of the October Revolution and the Civil War is a memorial in Ufa, Bashkortostan, Russia. It was opened in 1975.

== Description ==
The height of the monument is 12 meters along with the pedestal. The weight is 95 tons. The sculpture's material is bronze.

The monument includes three main sculptures — a worker with a rifle in his hands, a peasant on a horse and a Red Army soldier. The composition is completed by the image of an elderly fighter, who fell to one knee and holds the wound with his hand. Three warriors protect him with their bodies.

The author of the monument is sculptor Lev Kuznetsov.
